Coleophora amphorella is a moth of the family Coleophoridae that is endemic to Iran.

References

External links

amphorella
Moths of Asia
Endemic fauna of Iran
Moths described in 1994